Shemot (Hebrew, 'names') may refer to:

 Book of Exodus, or Shemot
 Shemot (parashah), in the Jewish cycle of Torah readings